East Hardwick is a village and civil parish in the City of Wakefield in West Yorkshire, England.  It has a population of 191, reducing to 173 at the 2011 Census.
Until 1974 it was part of Osgoldcross Rural District.

The name 'East Hardwick' has its origins in Old English. The 'East' distinguishes it from West Hardwick, and 'Hardwick' comes from the Old English phrase heorde-wīc, meaning a herd farm or a farm for livestock. It is an ancient community, adjoining the line of the Roman Great North Road now linking Pontefract to the North with the A1 and Doncaster in the south.

The village name does not appear in the Domesday Book of 1086, but is referred to in a deed dated 1120 as Herdwica, and in 1296 as Herdwyk. The name means herd farm – an area used for livestock rather than arable farming. The name East Hardwick had appeared by 1424.

The township, later civil parish of East Hardwick lies in the ecclesiastical parish of Pontefract, and was small at 528 acres. It became an independent parish in 1876 and its church record dates from 1874.

The earliest map dates from 1800 when the open fields were being enclosed. Two farms: Manor Farm and Norman’s farm extended over 150 acres and records show cattle farming as well as wheat, oats, barley, potatoes and pea production.

The layout of the village changed when the turnpike or toll-charging road from Leeds to Barnsdale Bar for fast horse-drawn traffic was built running through East Hardwick. Tolls were charged until 1878.

Until 1974 the village was part of Osgoldcross Rural District. It is now part of Wakefield Metropolitan District.

Today East Hardwick consists of three main areas: the Kennels, around Doncaster Road , the hamlet of Hundhill, and the main part of the village located along Darrington road, a small winding road leading to the what is known locally as ‘the Moor’. The village is still based around farming, although it is now a mixed community of residents.

The A639 road cuts through the western portion of the village, linking the settlement with Pontefract to the north and the A1 and Doncaster to the south-east.

There is also a small church: St Stephen's, and a village hall. There is no village shop or post office.

See also
Listed buildings in East Hardwick

References

External links

Villages in West Yorkshire
Civil parishes in West Yorkshire
Geography of the City of Wakefield